Svale Solheim (15 February 1903 – 20 December 1971) was a Norwegian folklorist. He was born in Naustdal. He graduated from the University of Oslo in 1934. He worked at the institution Norsk Folkeminnesamling from 1952 to 1956, and was appointed professor at the University of Oslo from 1956. Among his works are his doctor thesis Nemningsfordomar ved fiske from 1940, and Norsk sætertradisjon from 1952.

References

1903 births
1971 deaths
People from Naustdal
Norwegian sailors
Norwegian resistance members
Norwegian communists
Norwegian folklorists
University of Oslo alumni
Academic staff of the University of Oslo